Adrian Rebollar-Cortes (born November 12, 1999) is an American soccer player who plays as a midfielder for Monterey Bay F.C. in the USL Championship.

Career

Youth career
Rebollar played club soccer with the Santa Cruz Breakers academy team. In 2017, Rebollar attended California State University, Monterey Bay to play college soccer. Over four seasons, Rebollar made 63 appearances for the Otters, scoring 16 goals and tallying 14 assists. He was also a four-time All-California Collegiate Athletic Association honoree.

In 2019, Rebollar also played with USL League Two club Lionsbridge FC, making 14 appearances for them, tallying a single assist.

Professional
On March 11, 2022, Rebollar signed with USL Championship club Monterey Bay ahead of their inaugural season. He made his professional debut the following day on March 12, 2022, appearing as an 58th–minute substitute during a 2–4 loss to Phoenix Rising and scoring the team's second goal in the 87th–minute.

References

1999 births
American soccer players
Association football midfielders
College men's soccer players in the United States
Lionsbridge FC players
Living people
Monterey Bay FC players
People from Watsonville, California
Soccer players from California
USL Championship players
USL League Two players